Kazakhstan competed in the 2008 Asian Beach Games, held in Bali, Indonesia from October 18 to October 26, 2008.

Nations at the 2008 Asian Beach Games
2008
Asian Beach Games